Vulpian–Heidenhain–Sherrington phenomenon is a term given for slow contraction of denervated skeletal muscle by stimulating the autonomic cholinergic fibers innervating its blood vessels. It is named after French neurologist Alfred Vulpian (1826–87), German physiologist Rudolf Heidenhain (1834–1897) and English neurophysiologist Charles Scott Sherrington (1857–1952).

References

External link
  Definition from the Journal of Postgraduate Medicine, Sir Charles Sherrington

Neurophysiology
Muscular system